Željko Filip Engelman (born 9 February 1991) is a Serbian professional footballer who plays as a centre-back for Taichung Futuro at Taiwan Football Premier League.

Early life and youth
Engelman was born in Belgrade, but he grew up in Čačak where he played in the Remont youth system, before moving to the Serbia capital Belgrade, where he played for the Voždovac youth team.

He made his senior debut for Železnik, as a loaned player from Voždovac, after playing half of a season he returned to Voždovac and played one season.

Club career

After Serbia he started an international career in eight different countries, with occasional return to Serbia. He played in Romania, Slovakia, Albania, Poland, Croatia, Montenegro, Bosnia and Herzegovina and now in Mongolia.

He played for Unirea Urziceni in Romanian Liga I and Slovakian Dukla Banská Bystrica in Slovak Super Liga, after his first experiences as an international player he returned to Serbia, and played three more years, playing for Resnik, Jedinstvo Ub, Banat, Radnički Beograd and Voždovac where he played one season as captain.

In 2015, Engelman restarted his international career this time in Montenegro for Jezero Plav, making his official debut in a 0:0 draw with OFK Igalo. In January 2016 he moved to Croatia where he played with three clubs. His first club was Mladost Antin, where he debuted in a loss against Međimurje 0:2, in this season he made 21 appearances and scored one goal. After that he moved to Bjelovar in a season where the club had a historical result in the Croatian Cup. After the first round where they won against Marsonia, in the next round they won against ex-Croatian 1HNL champion with 4:0, in the next round they played against Dinamo Zagreb and lost in a hard game with 1:2. After that he made a transfer to the Poland club Cosmos Nowotaniec. He then returned one more time to Croatia to Vukovar 1991.

In January 2018, Engelman signed for ex-Bosnian and Herzegovian cup holder Slavija Sarajevo. He debuted in a friendly match against Sarajevo in Prva Liga RS against Sutjeska Foča in a 1:2 loss, playing 90 minutes. With good results in Prva Liga RS where the team was promoted to the play-offs, Engelman received an offer to continue his international career, but this time in Asia. He signed in May for one of the two best clubs in Monoglia and ex-champion Ulaanbaatar.

He made his debut in the Mazala Premier League with a home win against Khangarid. His next game was derby with defender of the title Erchim, playing 90 minutes in his standard position of centre-back in a 3:3 draw.

After a full season in Asia, his team Ulaanbaatar finished the championship as runner-up in the Mazala Premier League, with four points fewer than 2018 champion Erchim.

In summer 2019 he back in Serbian football, he signed one-year deal with Serbian league team, Borac Čačak.

Honours
Ulaanbaatar
 Mazala Premier League : Runners-up 2018

Borac Čačak
 Serbian League West : 2019-20

References

External links
 
 Željko Filip Engelman at cvgoal.com

1991 births
Living people
Footballers from Belgrade
Association football defenders
Serbian footballers
Serbian expatriate footballers
Serbian First League players
Montenegrin First League players
Slovak Super Liga players
Liga II players
FK Voždovac players
FK Železnik players
FC Unirea Urziceni players
FK Dukla Banská Bystrica players
FK Radnički Beograd players
FK Jedinstvo Ub players
FK Resnik players
KS Sopoti Librazhd players
FK Banat Zrenjanin players
FK Jezero players
NK Bjelovar players
FK Slavija Sarajevo players
FC Ulaanbaatar players
FK Borac Čačak players
OFK Beograd players
Taichung Futuro F.C. players
Serbian expatriate sportspeople in Romania
Serbian expatriate sportspeople in Slovakia
Serbian expatriate sportspeople in Albania
Serbian expatriate sportspeople in Montenegro
Serbian expatriate sportspeople in Croatia
Serbian expatriate sportspeople in Poland
Serbian expatriate sportspeople in Bosnia and Herzegovina
Expatriate footballers in Romania
Expatriate footballers in Slovakia
Expatriate footballers in Albania
Expatriate footballers in Montenegro
Expatriate footballers in Croatia
Expatriate footballers in Poland
Expatriate footballers in Bosnia and Herzegovina
Expatriate footballers in Mongolia
Expatriate footballers in Taiwan